Broadway Cinema is an independent cinema in the city of Nottingham, England in the United Kingdom.

It is located in the Hockley area. In 2009, it was rated as one of the best cinemas in the world by Total Film magazine.

History
The site now occupied by the cinema began its life as the Broad Street Wesleyan Church, which was built in 1839 by the architect S. S. Rawlinson. This church is reputedly where the founder of the Salvation Army, William Booth, was converted.

Since the 1960s, the site has housed the Co-operative Education Centre, the Nottingham Film Society, City Lights Cinema and, since 1982, the Broadway Cinema.

In 1993, the cinema was the venue for the UK premiere of Quentin Tarantino's Pulp Fiction, showing it immediately after its screening at the Cannes Film Festival. For many years, film director Shane Meadows worked out of the venue; he still uses it as a base for press interviews. Likewise, the filmmaker Jeanie Finlay has edited most of her films on the premises, including her Game of Thrones documentary The Last Watch.

In 2006, Broadway Cinema underwent a major redevelopment with funding from the National Lottery and Arts Council England. Works were completed in October 2006 and cost around £6 million. The cinema now boasts four screens, including the world's first (and only) cinema designed by Sir Paul Smith. It also houses two bars.

Laraine Porter (the co-founder and director of the British Silent Film Festival) was director of the Broadway Media Centre from January 1998 until May 2008. Consequently, between 1999 and 2008, Broadway Cinema hosted a series of festivals for silent film in conjunction with the British Film Institute.

References

External links
Broadway Cinema

Buildings and structures in Nottingham
Repertory cinemas
Cinemas in Nottinghamshire